Yoshimichi Hara (原嘉道) (February 18, 1867 – August 7, 1944) was a Japanese statesman and the president of the Japanese privy council during World War II, from June 1940 until his death.

Hara was always reluctant to use military force. In particular, he protested against the outbreak of the Pacific war at Gozen Kaigi.

Historian Charles Kupfer contradicts this statement in Indomitable Will: Turning Defeat into Victory from Pearl Harbor to Midway, Hara recognized the growing threat of American influence in the pacific region prior to American involvement in World War II, and was a key advocate for the attack on Pearl Harbor.  Hara was of the opinion that the longer Japan waited to engage the United States, the weaker its position would become thus subjugating the island nation to the will of American dominance in the region.  Indeed, Hara as president of the privy council, had very little political control, since almost all political power was concentrated in war cabinets. Hara did, however, act as the voice for Emperor Hirohito in the privy council and delivered the Emperor's decision to go to war on December 1, 1941, stating that to yield to American demands would threaten the existence of the Empire of Japan.

After his death, Hara was decorated with the posthumous title of Imperial . He was the last commoner to become part of the Japanese aristocracy.

References

|-

|-

|-

1867 births
1944 deaths
Kazoku